Whispering Ghosts is a 1942 American mystery film directed by Alfred L. Werker and starring Milton Berle, Brenda Joyce and John Shelton. The film concerns a group of people who try to solve a murder.

Premise
An unusual group of people gather on the wreck of a ship and try to solve a murder committed more than a decade earlier.

Cast
 Milton Berle as H. H. Van Buren  
 Brenda Joyce as Elizabeth Woods  
 John Shelton as David Courtland  
 John Carradine as Norbert  
 Willie Best as Euclid Brown  
 Edmund MacDonald as Jerry Gilpin  
 Arthur Hohl as Inspector Norris  
 Grady Sutton as Jonathan Flack  
 Milton Parsons as Dr. Walter Bascomb  
 Abner Biberman as Mack Wolf  
 Renie Riano as Meg  
 Charles Halton as Attorney Mark Gruber  
 Harry Hayden as Conroy 
 Frank Faylen as Curly the Announcer  
 Jack Gargan as Shadow  
 George Offerman Jr. as Chuck the Mechanic  
 Marvin Stephens as Page Boy

References

External links
 

1940s comedy mystery films
1942 films
20th Century Fox films
American black-and-white films
American comedy mystery films
Films about radio people
Films directed by Alfred L. Werker
Films set in New York City
Films scored by Emil Newman
Films scored by Leigh Harline
1942 comedy films
1940s English-language films
1940s American films